No Hard Feelings may refer to:

No Hard Feelings (2020 film), a 2020 German film
No Hard Feelings (2023 film), an upcoming American film
No Hard Feelings (album), an album by Dreezy
"No Hard Feelings" (song), a song by Old Dominion on the album Time, Tequila & Therapy
"No Hard Feelings", a song by the Avett Brothers on the album True Sadness
"No Hard Feelings", a song by the Bloodhound Gang on the album Hefty Fine
"No Hard Feelings", a song by Saliva on the album Survival of the Sickest
"No Hard Feelings", a song by Wolf Alice on the album Blue Weekend